Sergio de los Ríos Peztña (born 28 June 2003) is a Mexican professional footballer who plays as an attacking midfielder for Liga MX club América.

Career statistics

Club

Notes

Honours
Mexico U20
Revelations Cup: 2022

References

External links
 
 
 

Living people
2003 births
Association football midfielders
Mexican footballers
Liga MX players
Club América footballers
Footballers from Mexico City